A sooterkin is a fabled small creature about the size of a mouse that certain women were believed to have been capable of giving birth to. The origin of this initially jocular fantasy lies in the 18th century, and some eminent physicians of the day considered it factual. It is attributed to a tendency of Dutch women to frequently sit on stoves or use them under their petticoats to keep warm, hence causing the breeding of a small kind of animal that would mature and be born.

The English physician John Maubray published a work entitled The Female Physician, in which he proposed that it was possible for women to give birth to sooterkins. Maubray was an advocate for maternal impression, a widely held belief that conception and pregnancy could be influenced by what the pregnant mother dreamt of, or saw. Maubray warned pregnant women that over-familiarity with household pets could make their children resemble those animals. He was involved in the case of Mary Toft, who appeared to vindicate his theory by giving birth to rabbits, although the whole affair was eventually exposed for the hoax that it was.

Popular culture
The eponymous character in EB White's Stuart Little is a sooterkin.

References

External links
 Websters online dictionary entry for Sooterkin

English legendary creatures
Abortion